Fu Fai Garden is a Home Ownership Scheme and Private Sector Participation Scheme court built on reclaimed land in Ma On Shan, New Territories, Hong Kong near Ma On Shan Plaza, MOSTown and MTR Ma On Shan station. It was jointly developed by the Hong Kong Housing Authority and China Civil Engineering Construction Corporation and has a total of two blocks built in 1991.

Houses

Politics
Fu Fai Garden is located in Ma On Shan Town Centre constituency of the Sha Tin District Council. It is currently represented by Johnny Chung Lai-him, who was elected in the 2019 elections.

See also

Public housing estates in Ma On Shan

References

Ma On Shan
Home Ownership Scheme
Private Sector Participation Scheme
Residential buildings completed in 1991
1991 establishments in Hong Kong